Jack Wright is the name of:
Jack Wright (American football) (1871–1931), head football coach at the University of Washington
Jack Wright (character), the hero of a popular series of Victorian science fiction dime novels and story papers written by Luis Senarens
Jack Wright (footballer) (1878–1968), Australian footballer for Geelong 
Jack Wright (greyhound trainer) (1850–1929)
Jack Wright (politician) (1927–1998), Australian politician
Jack Wright (tennis) (1901–1949), Canadian tennis player
Jackie Wright (footballer) (1926-2005), English footballer who played for Blackpool
Jackie Wright (1900s–1989), Irish comedian and performer on The Benny Hill Show
Jack Wright (musician) (born 1942), American jazz musician, see :de:Jack Wright

See also
John Wright (disambiguation)